Bullyparade: The Movie is a 2017 German parody movie. Directed by Michael Herbig, it is a film adaptation of his ProSieben television show Bullyparade and features parodies of popular films and television series such as Star Trek, Star Wars, Barbarella, Sissi, Winnetou, Django Unchained, and The Wolf of Wall Street.

Plot 
The movie consists of five episodes that refer to elements of the TV show Bullyparade:

 Back to the Zone: A parody of Back to the Future, the Saxon brothers Jens and Jörg Kasirske want to prevent the fall of the Berlin wall in the year 1989 and the concert of David Hasselhoff which happened at this event. With a modified Trabant, they travel back in time to take part in the press conference of Günter Schabowski which is also visited by the Czech reporters Pavel Pipovič and Bronko Kulička.
 Winnetou in love: Blood brothers Winnetou and Old Shatterhand argue during a conference with other Native American tribes and diverge.15 years later, Winnetou wants to marry Annette, daughter of General Motors. Old Shatterhand, who now operates a boat hire in the desert, should be his best man. But Shatterhand is chased by the bounty hunters Dr. Schmitz and his hand puppet Tschango, because he shot Abraham Lincoln by mistake. As the blood brothers arrive at Annette and General Motors, Old Shatterhand notices that Motors only wants to gain the land of the Apache. He can convince Winnetou to prevent this transaction.
 Sissi – Menopause of an Empress: Emperor Franz, empress Sissi and their field marshal are in search for a weekend house and have to stay in a Haunted house, because the estate agent arrives to late. 
 Lutz of Wall Street: Lutz was caught while travelling without paying. Now he needs to pay 60 dollars fee or he has to go to prison. With the help of the broker Mr. Moneymaker, he earns many million dollars at the Wall Street with his laughter. Unluckily, Lutz spends all of the money.
 The Planet of Woman: The crew of the (T)Raumschiff Surprise (U.S.S. Hasselhoff) around Captain Kork, Mr. Spuck and Schrotty should protect the planet of women of the clone army around King Clone, because they try to cut the women's hair to use it for toupees. Later, they get help by the beverage suppliers Sigi Solo and the Yeti.

Cast

Cameos 

 Stefan Mross as Sergeant Mross (Winnetou in Love)
 Til Schweiger as Sheriff Chiller (Winnetou in Love)
 Elyas M'Barek as Chief of the Sioux (Winnetou in Love)
 Jürgen Vogel as Patient Prince Otto / Klaus Kinski (Menopause of an Empress)
 Matthias Schweighöfer as Stockbroker (Lutz of Wall Street)
 Lena Meyer-Landrut as Brunette siren of the Planet of woman (The Planet of Women)
 Lena Gercke as Blonde siren of the Planet of woman (The Planet of Women)
 Peter Maffay as himself (The Planet of Women)

See also
Bullyparade
Karl May film adaptations

References

External links 
 

2017 films
2010s Western (genre) comedy films
German parody films
German Western (genre) comedy films
2010s German-language films
2010s parody films
Films based on television series
Films directed by Michael Herbig
Winnetou films
2010s science fiction films
German science fiction films
Films set in the 24th century
Space adventure films
Films about time travel
Parody films based on Star Wars
Parody films based on Star Trek
2017 comedy films
2010s American films
2010s German films